San Antonio de Yare is a town in the state of Miranda, Venezuela.

Populated places in Miranda (state)